is a Japanese professional mixed martial artist and pro Shooto fighter.  From Kanagawa Prefecture, Japan, he now lives and trains in Tokyo at Wajitsu Keishukai's RJW (Real Japanese Wrestling) and Tokyo HQ.

Usui debuted in kickboxing six years ago, fighting in J-Network.  He started MMA 6 years ago, joining Wajitsu Keishukai  WK Sougo.  He was inspired to fight when one day, he saw one of his classmates from elementary school fighting in Shooto.  He gave MMA a try because it looked cool and interesting. Kickboxing has many restricting rules, but MMA has considerably less, which appealed to him.  A fighter could also grow bigger and stronger by training grappling.  He now trains as a pro, fighting in Professional Shooto, and GCM/WK sponsored events.

Career
 2001, July East Japan's Amateur Shooto light weight, ranked 3rd
 2001 Hokkaido Amateur Shooto Light weight Tournament runner up
 2001 Amateur 70 kg division, ranked 3rd
 2002, All East Japan Amateur Shooto Open Tournament light-weight winner
 2004 Pro Shooto 2004 Rookie-of-the-year runner up
 Pro Kickboxing J-Network Welter-weight, ranked 3rd place

Sources
 Fight Finder
 Wajitsu Keishukai profile
 Japanese MMA client site

Mixed martial arts record

|-
| Loss
| align=center| 10–8–1
| Issei Tamura
| Decision (unanimous)
| Shooto: Gig Tokyo 2
| 
| align=center| 2
| align=center| 5:00
| Tokyo, Japan
| 
|-
| Loss
| align=center| 10–7–1
| Hiroshi Nakamura
| Decision (unanimous)
| Shooto: Shooto Tradition 5
| 
| align=center| 3
| align=center| 5:00
| Tokyo, Japan
| 
|-
| Win
| align=center| 10–6–1
| Shinya Kumazawa
| Decision (unanimous)
| TF: Tenkaichi Fight 26
| 
| align=center| 2
| align=center| 5:00
| Chatan, Okinawa, Japan
| 
|-
| Win
| align=center| 9–6–1
| Sakae Kasuya
| Decision (majority)
| Shooto: Shooto Tradition 1
| 
| align=center| 2
| align=center| 5:00
| Tokyo, Japan
| 
|-
| Win
| align=center| 8–6–1
| Daisuke Ishizawa
| Decision (unanimous)
| Shooto: Back To Our Roots 7
| 
| align=center| 2
| align=center| 5:00
| Tokyo, Japan
| 
|-
| Loss
| align=center| 7–6–1
| Shintaro Ishiwatari
| Decision (unanimous)
| Shooto: Back To Our Roots 6
| 
| align=center| 2
| align=center| 5:00
| Tokyo, Japan
| 
|-
| Win
| align=center| 7–5–1
| Eiji Murayama
| Decision (unanimous)
| Shooto: Back To Our Roots 3
| 
| align=center| 2
| align=center| 5:00
| Tokyo, Japan
| 
|-
| Win
| align=center| 6–5–1
| Hiroki Kita
| Decision (unanimous)
| Shooto: Battle Mix Tokyo 1
| 
| align=center| 2
| align=center| 5:00
| Tokyo, Japan
| 
|-
| Draw
| align=center| 5–5–1
| Ed Newalu
| Draw
| PIP: East vs. West
| 
| align=center| 2
| align=center| 5:00
| Honolulu, Hawaii, United States
| 
|-
| Win
| align=center| 5–5
| Manabu Inoue
| Decision (majority)
| GCM: D.O.G. 5
| 
| align=center| 2
| align=center| 5:00
| Tokyo, Japan
| 
|-
| Win
| align=center| 4–5
| Michihisa Asano
| Decision (unanimous)
| MARS
| 
| align=center| 2
| align=center| 5:00
| Tokyo, Japan
| 
|-
| Loss
| align=center| 3-5
| Akitoshi Tamura
| Submission (rear-naked choke)
| Shooto: 9/23 in Korakuen Hall
| 
| align=center| 2
| align=center| 4:51
| Tokyo, Japan
| 
|-
| Win
| align=center| 3–4
| Naosuke Mizoguchi
| Submission (armlock)
| Shooto: 4/23 in Hakata Star Lanes
| 
| align=center| 2
| align=center| 2:38
| Hakata, Fukuoka, Japan
| 
|-
| Loss
| align=center| 2–4
| Takeshi Inoue
| KO (punch)
| Shooto: Wanna Shooto 2004
| 
| align=center| 2
| align=center| 4:58
| Tokyo, Japan
| 
|-
| Win
| align=center| 2–3
| Seigi Fujioka
| Decision (majority)
| Shooto 2004: 10/17 in Osaka Prefectural Gymnasium
| 
| align=center| 2
| align=center| 5:00
| Osaka, Japan
| 
|-
| Win
| align=center| 1–3
| Takeshi Matsushita
| Decision (majority)
| Shooto: Gig Central 5
| 
| align=center| 2
| align=center| 5:00
| Nagoya, Aichi, Japan
| 
|-
| Loss
| align=center| 0–3
| Keisuke Yamada
| Decision (majority)
| Shooto: 11/25 in Kitazawa Town Hall
| 
| align=center| 2
| align=center| 5:00
| Setagaya, Tokyo, Japan
| 
|-
| Loss
| align=center| 0–2
| Takeshi Inoue
| Decision (unanimous)
| Shooto: Shooter's Dream 2
| 
| align=center| 2
| align=center| 5:00
| Setagaya, Tokyo, Japan
| 
|-
| Loss
| align=center| 0–1
| Hiroyuki Takaya
| TKO (punches)
| Shooto: 2/6 in Kitazawa Town Hall
| 
| align=center| 2
| align=center| 2:06
| Setagaya, Tokyo, Japan
|

References

External links

Japanese male mixed martial artists
Lightweight mixed martial artists
Mixed martial artists utilizing boxing
Mixed martial artists utilizing kickboxing
Mixed martial artists utilizing wrestling
Sportspeople from Kanagawa Prefecture
Wajitsu Keishukai
1971 births
Living people